The 2000 Women's Eye Group World Team Squash Championships were held in Sheffield, England and took place from 17 November until 25 November 2000.

Seeds

Results

First round

Pool A

Pool B

Pool C

Pool D

Pool E

Pool F

Second round

Quarter-finals

Semi-finals

Third-place play-off

Final

See also 
World Team Squash Championships
World Squash Federation
World Open (squash)

References 

World Squash Championships
2000 in women's squash
Squash tournaments in the United Kingdom
International sports competitions hosted by England
Squash
Women
Squash in England